William Duane (February 17, 1872 – March 7, 1935) was an American physicist who conducted research on radioactivity and X-rays and their usage in the treatment of cancer. He developed the Duane-Hunt Law and Duane's hypothesis. He worked with Pierre and Marie Curie in their University of Paris laboratory for six years and developed a method for generating quantities of radon-222 "seeds" from radium for usage in early forms of brachytherapy.

He was a professor at the University of Colorado Boulder, professor-emeritus and chair of biophysics at Harvard University and research fellow of physics at the Harvard Cancer Commission. He received the John Scott Medal and the Comstock Prize in Physics in 1922 and the Leonard Prize of the American Roentgen Ray Society in 1923.

Early life and education
Duane was born in Philadelphia, Pennsylvania to Charles William and Emma Cushman (Lincoln) Duane. He was a direct descendant of Benjamin Franklin from his father's side.

He received an A.B. degree in mathematics from the University of Pennsylvania in 1892 and was valedictorian of his class. He studied at Harvard University and graduated with an A.B. in 1893. He worked as an assistant to John Trowbridge in his research on Hertzian waves and received an A.M. degree in 1895.

He received a Tyndall Fellowship from Harvard and conducted research on electromagnetism under Emil Warburg at the University of Berlin. His doctoral advisor was Walter Nernst from the University of Gottingen. Duane received his doctorate degree from the University of Berlin after his dissertation Uber elektrolytische Thermoketten was accepted by Max Planck.

Academic career

He worked as a professor of physics at the University of Colorado Boulder from 1898 to 1907. He spent a one-year sabbatical with Pierre and Marie Curie in their radium research laboratory at the University of Paris in 1906 and was then invited to work with them from 1907 to 1912. He published 17 scientific papers during this time mostly around the properties of X-rays from radioactive sources and the measurement of heat generated from radioactive disintegration.  Although none of the papers were in direct collaboration with the Curies, he worked closely with them and it was reported that when Marie Curie visited America years later, she stated that she most wanted to see "Niagara Falls, The Grand Canyon and William Duane"

Duane refined a technique for extracting radon-222 gas from radium sulfate solutions. Solutions containing 1 gram of radium were "milked" to create radon "seeds" of about 20 millicuries each.  These "seeds" were distributed throughout Paris for use in endocurietherapy. Duane perfected this "milking" technique during his time in Paris and referred to the device as a "radium cow".

He returned to the United States in 1913 and worked in a joint role as assistant professor of physics at Harvard and Research Fellow in Physics of the Harvard Cancer Commission. The Cancer Commission was founded in 1901 and hired Duane to investigate the usage of radium emanations in the treatment of cancer. In 1915 he built Boston's first "radium cow" and thousands of patients were treated with the radon-222 generated from it. He published eight papers on the technical details of using radioactive material and X-Rays in the treatment of cancer. In 1917, Harvard created the chair of bio-physics for him.

Duane made important contributions to the technical details of measuring X-ray dosage in terms of the ionization of air. He conducted research to determine the structure of matter and on the mechanism of radiation. He developed the Duane-Hunt law, relating the minimum wavelength of X-rays to the threshold voltage of the cathode rays  that excite them; and Duane's hypothesis of quantized translative momentum transfer.

In 1925, Arthur Compton demonstrated that the scattering of 130,000-volt X-rays from the first sixteen elements in the periodic table (hydrogen through sulfur) were polarized. Duane spearheaded an effort to prove that Compton's interpretation of the Compton effect was wrong. Duane carried out a series of experiments to disprove Compton, but instead found evidence that Compton was correct. In 1924, Duane conceded that this was the case.

He served as Councillor of the Societe de Physique from 1920 to 1923, as Chairman of the Division of Physical Sciences of the National Research Council from 1922 to 1923, as President of the Society for Cancer Research in 1923 and as Vice President of section B of the American Association for the Advancement of Science from 1927 to 1928.

After his retirement from Harvard in 1934, he was awarded the title professor of Biophysics Emeritus.

Death
Starting in 1925, Duane began suffering a continual decline in health brought on by diabetes.  He died on March 7, 1935, due to a second paralytic stroke.  He was interred at Laurel Hill Cemetery in Philadelphia, Pennsylvania.

Honours and awards
He received the John Scott Medal and the Comstock Prize in Physics from the National Academy of Sciences in 1922. He received the Leonard Prize of the American Roentgen Ray Society in 1923.

He was awarded honorary Sc.D degrees from the University of Pennsylvania in 1922 and the University of Colorado Boulder in 1923.

In 1971, the physics department building at the University of Colorado Boulder was named in his honor.

Selected publications

Citations

Sources

Further reading

External links
 The Transfer in Quanta of Radiation Momentum to Matter -- Duane 9 (5): 158 -- Proceedings of the National Academy of Sciences
William Duane Papers - University of Colorado Boulder Library

1872 births
1935 deaths
19th-century American physicists
20th-century American physicists
American nuclear physicists
Burials at Laurel Hill Cemetery (Philadelphia)
Experimental physicists
Franklin family
Harvard University alumni
Harvard University faculty
Humboldt University of Berlin alumni
Medical physicists
People with diabetes
Scientists from Philadelphia
Spectroscopists
University of Colorado Boulder faculty
University of Göttingen alumni
University of Pennsylvania School of Arts and Sciences alumni
X-ray pioneers